Samsung Exclaim (SPH-M550) is a dual-slider mobile phone, meaning it contains both an alpha numeric as well as a full QWERTY keyboard packed into one device.
The phone became available to US Sprint users in June 2009 for $79.00 after a mail-in rebate and a two-year service contract from the carrier. Preloaded applications include YouTube, Google Maps, Sprint Social Zone, Facebook, and MySpace, among others.

Features

References

External links
 Official Page
 Official Samsung community discussion at SprintUsers.com
 CNET review (June 26 2009)
 Review at phonearena.com

Samsung mobile phones
Mobile phones introduced in 2009